Stardust is a top-scrolling shoot 'em up developed by Spanish studio Topo Soft and released in the UK by Kixx in 1987 for the ZX Spectrum.  The full version was included on a Sinclair User covertape in 1991.  It was also released for Amstrad CPC, DOS, and MSX.

The introductory screens included music composed by Pablo Toledo.  The same music was later re-used for the game Bronx.

Gameplay 
The player controls a small space ship called an "Astrohunter", which flies over the surface of a series of large enemy supercruisers on their way to attack Earth.  The player must avoid or destroy various ground targets and free-flying drones in order to eventually reach an array of shield generators. The ship is equipped with a gun that can be improved by collecting power-ups, and a second weapon that targets objects on the ground. 

When all the supercruisers have been passed, the Astrohunter lands in an enemy starship and its pilot continues on foot to reach the shield generators.   After destroying the generators the pilot must be returned to the ship to escape.

References 

1987 video games
Amstrad CPC games
DOS games
MSX games
Multiplayer and single-player video games
Shoot 'em ups
Topo Soft games
U.S. Gold games
Video games developed in Spain
ZX Spectrum games